Thomas More Barrett (born April 30, 1981) is an American politician who served as a member of the Michigan Senate from the 24th district. A Republican, he previously served in the Michigan House of Representatives from 2015 to 2019. Prior to his election to the House, Barrett served as a liaison between the Michigan Department of Treasury and the office of the Governor of Michigan. Barrett was the Republican nominee in the 2022 election for Michigan's 7th congressional district, which he lost to incumbent Democrat Elissa Slotkin.

Early life and education 
Barrett was born in Southfield, Michigan. He graduated from Western Michigan University with a Bachelor of Arts degree in political science.

U.S. Army 
After graduating from high school, Barrett joined the Army, where he served for 21 years. He served abroad in South Korea, Guantanamo Bay, Kuwait, and Iraq, and is a veteran of both Operation Enduring Freedom and Operation Iraqi Freedom. He served in the Michigan Army National Guard, holding the rank of Chief Warrant Officer 2, until retiring in 2022.

Political career

Michigan House of Representatives (2014–2019) 

Barrett was first elected to the Michigan House of Representatives in 2014, narrowly beating Democratic incumbent Theresa Abed. He won re-election in 2016, defeating Theresa Abed in a rematch. Barrett garnered 54% of the vote to Abed's 43% and Libertarian Marc Lord's 3%.

Michigan Senate (2019–present) 
Barrett was elected to the Michigan Senate in 2018, and currently chairs the Transportation and Infrastructure Committee.

Barrett was a vocal critic of Michigan Governor Gretchen Whitmer's handing of the COVID-19 pandemic, and sponsored Senate Bill 858 to regulate the governor's state of emergency powers, which the governor vetoed in May 2020.

In January 2021, Barrett was one of eleven state senators to sign a letter to Congress requesting an "objective and transparent investigation into credible allegations of misconduct" into the 2020 presidential election. There are no "credible allegations of misconduct" in the 2020 election. Barrett has also claimed that the legitimacy of the 2020 election is "unknowable".

2022 U.S. House election

In November 2021, Barrett announced his candidacy for the U.S. House of Representatives in the 2022 election for Michigan's 7th congressional district. He won the Republican primary in August 2022, but lost to Democratic incumbent Elissa Slotkin in the November general election, receiving 46% of the vote to her 52%.

Bridge Michigan reported that, as of October 12, 2022, this was the most costly congressional election in the U.S. By November 4, over $36 million had been spent by both campaigns.

Personal life 
Barrett lives in Charlotte, Michigan, with his wife, Ashley, and their four children.

References

External links 
 

1981 births
21st-century American politicians
Candidates in the 2022 United States House of Representatives elections
Living people
Republican Party members of the Michigan House of Representatives
Republican Party Michigan state senators
People from Southfield, Michigan
Western Michigan University alumni